Boldhusgade 4 is a Neoclassical property off the Ved Stranden canalfront in central Copenhagen, Denmark. The building was like most of the other buildings in the area constructed in the years after the Copenhagen Fire of 1795. It was listed in the Danish registry of protected buildings and places in 1959.

History
The property (then No, 209) was in 1689 owned by one Lars Pedersen. In 1756, it was as No. 245 owned by former director of Kvæsthuset Gregorius Nielsn'e widow Gertrud Catharina. The building was destroyed in the Copenhagen Fire of 1795. The current building was completed in 1796 for merchant Nikolaj H. Wismer. It was in the new cadastre of 1806 listed as No. 223 and was by then owned by his widow who had continued his tobacco business.

The building was at the time of the 1880 census home to a total of 20 people. Adolph Johannes Gjelstrup	, a master tailor, resided with his wife, two children, a maid and a lodger on the two lower floors. Lauritz Peter Christian Hansen, a merchant, resided with his wife and a maid on the second floor. Hans Magnus Staal, ticket cashier at the Royal Danish Theatre, resided with his wife, son and a maid on the third floor. Henriette Augusta Westphalm a retailer and widow, resided with her two children (aged 22 and 23) in the basement. 	Juline Christine Falck, another widow, resided with her three children (aged 15 to 19) on the fourth floor.

Architecture
Boldhusgade 4 is in four storeys over a raised cellar. The building is just four bays wide.  The fourth storey was added in 1858. A flight of granite stairs lead up to the main entrance in the easternmost bay. The door is topped by a transom window.

A three-bay perpendicular side wing extends from the rear side of the building.

Today
Boldhusgade 4 is today owned by Ejerlejfore Boldhusgade 4.

References

External links
 1880 census

Listed residential buildings in Copenhagen
Residential buildings completed in 1796
1796 establishments in Denmark